Hughes Lake is a sag pond on the San Andreas Fault in the northern Sierra Pelona Mountains, in Los Angeles County, California.

Geography
Referred to before 1924 as West Elizabeth Lake, Lake Hughes is one of a series of sag ponds in the foothills of the Sierra Pelona Mountains, including Elizabeth Lake, and Munz Lakes, all created by the active motion of tectonic plates on the San Andreas Fault. They are part of the northern upper Santa Clara River watershed.

The lake, at 973 m (3192 ft) in elevation, is within the Angeles National Forest.

The community of Lake Hughes, an unincorporated community, began settlement in the area around 1873.

See also
 
  – related topics
 List of lakes in California

References

Lakes of Los Angeles County, California
Santa Clara River (California)
Lake Hughes
Lake Hughes
Lakes of California
Lakes of Southern California